The Community of Christ Seminary at the Independence campus of Graceland University is the official and only seminary of Community of Christ. It offers two graduate degrees:  a Master of Arts in Religion for full-time Community of Christ ministers from North America, Europe and French Polynesia, and a Master of Art in Peace and Social Transformation. In addition, it collaborates with several Community of Christ ministerial education programs, including Ministerial Education and Discipleship Studies (MEADS), the Co-Missioned pastors Initiative (CPI), Congregational Leaders Workshop, and the International Leaders Curriculum (ILC).  Courses are offered during intensive three-week sessions, as part of an "evening semester" program or via the Internet. The current Dean of the Community of Christ Seminary is Zac Harmon-McLaughlin. Zac Harmon-McLaughlin was hired as the directortor of the Seminary while he was still a candidate in Doctorate of Ministry in Executive Leadership from the San Francisco Theological Seminary and his father-in-law Ron Harmon was the President of the Council of Twelve Apostles in Community of Christ. As of February 2023, the Seminary is composed of nine American faculty members teaching an international audience in English, among whom Katie Harmon-McLaughlin, wife of Zac Harmon-McLaughlin.

Notes

External links
Community of Christ Seminary

Community of Christ
Graceland University
Latter Day Saint movement in Missouri
Seminaries and theological colleges in Missouri